Dato' Haji Mohamed bin Nasir (1916 – 21 February 1997) was a Malaysian politician. He served as the fifteenth Menteri Besar of Kelantan from 1973 to 1978.

Mohamed founded Pan-Malaysian Islamic Front (BERJASA) in 1977 under the persuasion and endorsement of United Malays National Organisation (UMNO) who were dissatisfied with the demands of and in squabbles for the lump share in controlling the Barisan Nasional (BN) state of Kelantan with the Pan-Malaysian Islamic Party (PAS).

Early life
Mohamed Nasir was born in 1916 in Kampung Kota, Kota Bharu. His grandmother Malin Padek was from West Sumatra. He was blessed with a total of 16 children as a result of living together with Che Zainab binti Haji Ismail, Wan Mariam binti Wan Yusoff and Nik Khamsiah binti Nik Mohamed. He was educated at the Kelantan Islamic Religious Council School, Royal English School, Kuala Krai. He obtained his Diploma in Agriculture in 1937 after studying at Serdang Agricultural College. He continued his studies by learning the Quran and Hadith from Maulana Ahmad Ali Lahore and Maulana Mohamed Shah. Then, he led the preaching movement throughout Kelantan.

Political career 
In 1959, Mohamed Nasir started his active politics and was appointed as Deputy Chief Minister of Kelantan. After winning the 1974 General Election, he was given a mandate by Barisan Nasional to lead the administration of Kelantan until he was pulled by the Federal Government to be appointed as a Senator and then Minister without Portfolio. He was a cabinet minister in the leadership of the Barisan Nasional government at that time.  The 2nd Malaysian Prime Minister, Tun Abdul Razak invited PAS to join the Barisan Nasional after the 13 May incident. Apart from leading the Berjasa Party, he was also active in voluntary service such as being President of Perkim Kelantan, President of Kelantan Former Soldiers, President of JP Kelantan, Founder of Balaghulmubin Religious School, Patron of Kelantan Indian Muslim Association and Founder of Kelantan Islamic Higher Education Center.

Death 
Mohamed Nasir died in Melbourne Hospital, Melbourne, Victoria, Australia on Friday, 21 February 1997 at 1.45 pm due to old age and was buried in Northern Memorial Park Cemetery, Melbourne, Victoria, Australia.

Honours
  :
 Companion of the Order of the Defender of the Realm (J.M.N.) (1974)
  :
  Knight Grand Commander of the Order of the Crown of Kelantan (SPMK) - Dato' (1975)

See also
 1977 Kelantan Emergency

References

1916 births
1997 deaths
People from Kelantan
Malaysian expatriates in Australia
Malaysian political party founders
Leaders of political parties in Malaysia
Pan-Malaysian Islamic Front
Pan-Malaysian Islamic Front politicians
Malaysian Islamic Party politicians
Chief Ministers of Kelantan
Kelantan state executive councillors
Members of the Kelantan State Legislative Assembly
Members of the Dewan Negara
Government ministers of Malaysia
20th-century Malaysian politicians